Addison Road–Seat Pleasant is a rapid-transit railway station on the Washington Metro's Blue and Silver Lines. It is operated by the Washington Metropolitan Area Transit Authority, who opened it in 1980. It was the eastern end of the Blue Line until 2004. The station is in Seat Pleasant on Central Avenue, although its official address puts it in Capitol Heights.

History
Originally named "Addison Road"; "Seat Pleasant" was added in 2000, and moved to a new subtitle location in 2011. It was the eastern terminus of the Blue Line from its opening until December 18, 2004, when the extension to the Largo Town Center station opened to the east. In the early eighties, due to peculiarities of the system at the time, trains travelling toward Addison Road showed blue rollsigns, but switched to orange signs before departing westward, back into the city.

In December 2003, security cameras at this station filmed a deer walking around the station mezzanine, running down an escalator, and going down the platform past a waiting train, as startled passengers watched. The deer then jumped onto the tracks and escaped into nearby woods. Metro spokesperson Lisa Farbstein reported that Metro had nicknamed the deer "Rudolph the Blue Line Reindeer".  

In December 2012, Addison Road was one of five stations added to the route of the Silver Line, which was originally supposed to end at the Stadium–Armory station, but was extended into Prince George's County, Maryland, to the Largo Town Center station (the eastern terminus of the Blue Line) due to safety concerns about a pocket track just past Stadium-Armory. Silver Line service at Addison Road began on July 26, 2014.

In May 2018, Metro announced an extensive renovation of platforms at twenty stations across the system. The platform at the Addison Road station would be rebuilt from February 13 to May 23, 2021.

Station layout

References

External links
 

 The Schumin Web Transit Center: Addison Road–Seat Pleasant Station
 Central Avenue entrance from Google Maps Street View

Stations on the Blue Line (Washington Metro)
Stations on the Silver Line (Washington Metro)
Washington Metro stations in Maryland
Railway stations in the United States opened in 1980
1980 establishments in Maryland